The Misewa Saga is a series of four middle grade fiction fantasy novels being written by Canadian author David Robertson. The series covers the adventures of Morgan and Eli, two young Indigenous foster children who discover a magical portal that leads them to another world. The series is inspired by Narnia, but with a specific focus on Indigenous stories and culture. It is set alternately in modern-day Winnipeg, Manitoba and in the magical world of the North Country, in which the village of Misewa is the last remaining settlement. The first two books have been bestsellers, and the series has been optioned by Disney subsidiary ABC Signature.

Novels

The Barren Grounds
The novel opens with Morgan waking up in her foster family's house in Winnipeg, Manitoba, where she has lived for two months. She lives with Eli, another Indigenous foster child, and their foster parents, James and Katie. Morgan introduces Eli to the attic in their house, where Morgan secretly spends time reading, and he starts drawing a picture of an animal walking across a snowy field. The children staple this drawing to a painted-over door in the closet, and inadvertently create a portal to Misewa.

Upon entering the portal, Morgan and Eli are discovered by Ochek, who brings them to the only surviving village in the North Country. He tells them about the man who caused them to be stuck in the White Time, or a permanent winter. Morgan and Eli help Ochek find the summer birds that create the Green Time, or summer. In the process, Ochek is shot with an arrow, whereupon he bursts into flashes of light and turns into seven stars, forming the Big Dipper, and the Green Time is restored.

The Great Bear
While Eli faces bullying in school, Morgan must decide on an important choice regarding her birth mother. The two utilize time travel and meet a young fisher who is potentially their friend from the first book — in this adventure, the group of friends must save the village which is in danger once more.

‘’The stone child’’

After discovering a near-lifeless Eli at the base of the Great Tree, Morgan knows she doesn’t have much time to save him. And it will mean asking for help-from old friends and new. Racing against the clock with Arik and Emily at her side, Morgan sets off to follow the trail away from the Great Tree and find Eli’s soul before it’s to late. As they journey deep into the northern woods, a place they’ve been warned to never enter, they face new challenges and life threatening attacks from strange and horrifying creatures. But a surprise ally comes to their aid, and Morgan finds the strength to for as on what’s most important: saving her brother’s life.

Characters
 Morgan is the primary protagonist of the novel. She is a 13 year-old girl who's grown up in foster-care and feels disconnected from her Indigenous culture prior to coming to Misewa. She likes movies and fantasy books. She is angry and maintains a tentative relationship with her foster family. 
 Eli (Assini Agassi) is a 12 year-old boy who recently entered the foster-care system. He likes to draw, wears his hair in a braid, and is the foster brother to Morgan. He is Cree and feels connected to his culture.
 Katie is Morgan and Eli's foster mother who attempts to use their Indigenous culture as a way to connect.
 James is Morgan and Eli's foster father who tells jokes and fun breakfasts, which Morgan doesn't like. 
 Emily is Morgan's classmate and friend. She is known for giving people nicknames and playing ice hockey.
 Mrs. Edwards is Morgan's English teacher who encourages her to try harder when writing poetry by making her re-do assignments.
 Mrs. Bignell is Morgan's art teacher who punishes her for interrupting class.
 Ochek is a fisher "humanoid" from Askí which walks on two legs and speaks. He is the provider of Misewa who befriends Eli and Morgan.
 Muskwa is a bear and the leader of Misewa. He is one of three members of Council.
 Tahtakiw is a crane who betrays Misewa by helping Napéw and creating the White Time.
 Napéw is the antagonist of the novel who came to Misewa before Eli and Morgan, stealing the summer birds for himself and setting off an eternal winter. He is described as "just an ordinary, middle-aged white man".
 Arik is a squirrel who steals from Ochek's traps. When caught, she offers to help find the summer birds to save Misewa. She becomes Morgan, Eli, and Ochek's friend.
 Miskinahk is a turtle and a member of the Misewa Council. 
 Oho is an owl and a member of Misewa Council. 
 Mahihkan: is a wolf who supports Napéw and is an enemy to Morgan and Eli. He receives redemption by saving their lives. And later helps save Eli when his soul is taken
 Kisémanitou is the Creator who speaks to the people and animals of Misewa during important moments.
 Mistapew is a giant who moves like a ghost and steals souls. He is known as Big Foot in Morgan and Eli's world. 
 Kihiw is the elder who had their soul stolen by Mistapew.
 ‘’’Jenny trout’’’ Morgan’s birth mother
 ‘’’Morgans kokom/grandmother ‘’’

Reception
The Barren Grounds received attention from several groups, and was nominated and selected for multiple awards:

The Barren Grounds and The Great Bear both received favourable reviews from Kirkus Reviews.

References

External links
 Penguin Random House pages for the series.

External links
The Penguin Random House Canada Website

Fantasy novel series
Fictional Native American people